The Chinese Handball Association (CHA) is the governing body of handball and beach handball in the People's Republic of China. CHA is affiliated to the International Handball Federation and Asian Handball Federation. Founded in 1979, CHA is also affiliated to the Chinese Olympic Committee, East Asian Handball Federation. It is based in Beijing.

National teams
 China men's national handball team
 China men's national junior handball team
 China men's national youth handball team
 China women's national handball team
 China women's national junior handball team
 China women's national youth handball team

Competitions hosted

International
 2020 Women's Youth World Handball Championship 
 2019 IHF Women's Super Globe
 2014 Summer Youth Olympics
 2009 World Women's Handball Championship
 2008 Summer Olympics
 1999 Women's Junior World Handball Championship

Continental
 2022 Asian Games
 2021 Asian Youth Games
 2019 Asian Beach Handball Championship
 2013 Asian Youth Games
 2012 Asian Beach Games
 2010 Asian Games
 2006 Asian Women's Handball Championship
 2000 Asian Women's Handball Championship
 1996 Asian Women's Junior Handball Championship
 1993 Asian Women's Handball Championship
 1992 Asian Men's Junior Handball Championship
 1992 Asian Women's Junior Handball Championship
 1990 Asian Games
 1990 Asian Women's Junior Handball Championship
 1989 Asian Men's Handball Championship
 1989 Asian Women's Handball Championship
 1979 Asian Men's Handball Championship

References

External links
 Official website (in Chinese Language)
 Chinese Handball Association at IHF site

Handball
Handball in China
1979 establishments in China
Sports organizations established in 1979
Handball governing bodies